Anna Louise Henderson (born 14 November 1998) is a British racing cyclist, who currently rides for UCI Women's Continental Team . She rode in the women's road race event at the 2018 UCI Road World Championships. In 2018, Henderson won the British National Circuit Race Championships, and the under-23 British National Time Trial Championships in 2019.

Major results

2018
 1st  National Criterium Championships
 Tour Series
1st Round 5 – Aberystwyth
1st Round 6 – Stevenage
2019
 National Under–23 Road Championships
1st  Road race
1st  Time trial
 Tour Series
1st Round 4 – Durham
1st Round 7 – Brooklands
 2nd Road race, National Road Championships
 3rd  Mixed team relay, UCI Road World Championships
2021
 1st  Time trial, National Road Championships
 1st  British National Derny Championships
 1st  Overall Kreiz Breizh Elites Dames
1st Stages 1 & 2
 7th Dwars door het Hageland WE
 8th Le Samyn
 10th Overall Healthy Ageing Tour
 10th GP de Plouay
2022
 1st Prologue Grand Prix Elsy Jacobs
 RideLondon Classique
1st  Mountains classification
1st  British rider classification
 2nd  Time trial, Commonwealth Games
 3rd Road race, National Road Championships
 7th Omloop Het Nieuwsblad

References

External links

 

1998 births
Living people
British female cyclists
Place of birth missing (living people)
European Games competitors for Great Britain
Cyclists at the 2019 European Games
Sportspeople from Hemel Hempstead
20th-century British women
21st-century British women